The 2015–16 Troy Trojans women's basketball team represented Troy University during the 2015–16 NCAA Division I women's basketball season. The Trojans, led by fourth year head coach Chanda Rigby, played their home games at Trojan Arena and were members of the Sun Belt Conference. They finished the season 20–13, 12–8 in Sun Belt play to finish in fourth place. They won the Sun Belt Tournament for the first time in school history and earn an automatic trip to the NCAA women's tournament for the first time since 1997. They lost in the first round to Oregon State.

Roster

Schedule

|-
!colspan=9 style="background:#960018; color:white;"|  Exhibition

|-
!colspan=9 style="background:#960018; color:white;"| Non-conference regular season

|-
!colspan=9 style="background:#960018; color:white;"| Sun Belt regular season

|-
!colspan=9 style="background:#960018; color:white;"| Sun Belt Women's Tournament

|-
!colspan=9 style="background:#960018; color:white;"| NCAA Women's Tournament

See also
 2015–16 Troy Trojans men's basketball team

References

Troy Trojans women's basketball seasons
Troy
Troy